Harelaw is a village in County Durham, in England. It is situated to the north of Annfield Plain.

References

Villages in County Durham
Stanley, County Durham